Bermejo is the easternmost department of Chaco Province in Argentina.

The provincial subdivision has a population of about 24,000 inhabitants in an area of  2,562 km², and its capital city is La Leonesa, which is located around 100 km from the provincial capital.

Settlements
General Vedia
Isla del Cerrito
La Leonesa
Las Palmas
Puerto Bermejo
Puerto Eva Perón

References

Departments of Chaco Province